Gene Summers In Nashville is a 10" vinyl album by Gene Summers. It was recorded at the Young 'Un Sound Studio Nashville, Tennessee in 1980 and contains rockabilly and country tracks performed by Summers. It was issued on the French Big Beat label in 1981.

Backing Summers were some of the Nashville A-Team session musicians including Dale Sellers, Jerry Stembridge, Stu Basore, Charlie McCoy, Mike Leech, Hayward Bishop and The Jordanaires. The session engineers were Stan Dacus and Chip Young. It was produced by Chip Young and was a Michael Cattin production.

Track listing

External links
 Album back cover image with credits

1981 albums
Gene Summers albums